"I Believe" is a song by Irish singer-songwriter Stephen Gately from his debut solo album, New Beginning. It was released on 14 October 2000 in the United Kingdom. The song debuted at number 11 in the UK. The song was used for the soundtrack of the film Billy Elliot.

Track listing
UK CD single
 "I Believe"
 "Waiting for This Feeling"
 "Where Did You Go" (Live with Boyzone at Wembley)

UK cassette single
 "I Believe"
 "I Believe" (Love to Infinity Remix)
 "I Believe" (Jewels & Stone Remix)
 "I Believe" (Almighty Remix)

Charts

References

2000 singles
2000 songs
Songs written by Steve Mac
Songs written by Wayne Hector
Polydor Records singles
Song recordings produced by Steve Mac